The voiced retroflex lateral flap is a type of consonantal sound, used in some spoken languages. The sound may also be transcribed as a short , or with the old dot diacritic, .

Features
Features of the voiced retroflex lateral flap:

Occurrence

A retroflex lateral flap has been reported from various languages of Sulawesi such as the Sangiric languages, Buol and Totoli, as well as Nambikwara in Brazil (plain and laryngealized), Gaagudju in Australia, Purépecha and Western Rarámuri in Mexico, Moro in Sudan, O'odham and Mohawk in the United States, Chaga in Tanzania, and Kanuri in Nigeria.

Various Dravidian and Indo-Aryan languages of Indian subcontinent are reported to have a retroflex lateral flap, either phonemically or phonetically, including Gujarati, Konkani, Marathi, Odia, and Rajasthani. Masica describes the sound as widespread in the Indic languages of India:

Dedicated letter
A letter is implicit in the IPA: the letter for the alveolar lateral flap with the tail of the retroflex consonants,

This was added to Unicode in 2020, and as of 2022 only a few fonts support it, such as the free SIL International fonts Gentium Plus, Charis, and Doulos.

References

External links
 

Lateral consonants
Retroflex consonants
Tap and flap consonants
Pulmonic consonants
Oral consonants